The Lazarraga Palace is a palace located in Zalduondo, Álava, Basque Country, Spain. It was declared Bien de Interés Cultural in 1984. The palace, located next to the parish church, was built in the 16th century. It is notable for the large coat of arms in its façade, as well as for a well-preserved Mannerist mural painting.

References

External links
 

Bien de Interés Cultural landmarks in Álava
Buildings and structures in Álava
Houses completed in the 16th century
Palaces in the Basque Country (autonomous community)